The Austrian Basketball Bundesliga (in German: Österreichische Basketball Bundesliga) was the top men's professional basketball league in Austria.Eurobasket.com Until the 2004–05 season, the league was known as the A-Liga (A-League) and then until the 2008–09 season it was called the Österreichische Basketball Bundesliga (ÖBL). From 2008 to 2019, it was named the Admiral Basketball League, after the league's main sponsor, Admiral Sportwetten.

In 2019, the competition was replaced by the Basketball Superliga.

Competition format
In the current season each team plays the other nine teams four times, creating a 36-game regular-season schedule. After that, the top six teams move on. The two semi-finals winners meet in a best-of-seven championship series.

Clubs

Title holders

 1946–47 WAC
 1947–48 Not held
 1948–49 Admira Wien
 1949–50 Post Wien
 1950–51 Wiener Sportclub
 1951–52 Handelsministerium
 1952–53 Union Babenberg
 1953–54 Union Babenberg
 1954–55 Union Babenberg
 1955–56 Engelmann Wien
 1956–57 Union Babenberg
 1957–58 Engelmann Wien
 1958–59 Union Babenberg
 1959–60 Engelmann Wien
 1960–61 Engelmann Wien
 1961–62 Engelmann Wien
 1962–63 Handelsministerium
 1963–64 Handelsministerium
 1964–65 Handelsministerium
 1965–66 Union Kuenring
 1966–67 Engelmann Wien
 1967–68 Engelmann Wien
 1968–69 Engelmann Wien
 1969–70 Engelmann Wien
 1970–71 Radio Koch Wien
 1971–72 Radio Koch Wien
 1972–73 Wienerberger
 1973–74 Wienerberger
 1974–75 Sefra Wien
 1975–76 Sefra Wien
 1976–77 Shopping Centre Wien
 1977–78 Klosterneuburg
 1978–79 UBSC Wien
 1979–80 UBSC Wien
 1980–81 UBSC Wien
 1981–82 UBSC Wien
 1982–83 Klosterneuburg
 1983–84 Klosterneuburg
 1984–85 Klosterneuburg
 1985–86 Klosterneuburg
 1986–87 Klosterneuburg
 1987–88 Klosterneuburg
 1988–89 Klosterneuburg
 1989–90 Klosterneuburg
 1990–91 Möllersdorf
 1991–92 Union SPI
 1992–93 UBC Sankt Pölten
 1993–94 Möllersdorf
 1994–95 UBC Sankt Pölten
 1995–96 UBC Sankt Pölten
 1996–97 UBC Sankt Pölten
 1997–98 UBC Sankt Pölten
 1998–99 UBC Sankt Pölten
 1999–00 Traiskirchen Lions
 2000–01 Kapfenberg Bulls
 2001–02 Kapfenberg Bulls
 2002–03 Kapfenberg Bulls
 2003–04 Kapfenberg Bulls
 2004–05 Swans Gmunden
 2005–06 Swans Gmunden
 2006–07 Swans Gmunden
 2007–08 Panthers Fürstenfeld
 2008–09 Kraftwerk Wels
 2009–10 Swans Gmunden
 2010–11 Oberwart Gunners
 2011–12 Xion Dukes Klosterneuburg
 2012–13 Zepter Vienna
 2013–14 Güssing Knights
 2014–15 Güssing Knights
 2015–16 Redwell Oberwart Gunners
 2016–17 ece Bulls Kapfenberg
 2017–18 ece Bulls Kapfenberg
 2018–19 ece Bulls Kapfenberg

Finals

Awards
Most Valuable Player
Finals MVP
Coach of the Year
Most Valuable Austrian Player

All-Star Game

The ÖBL held an annual all-star game, pitting a team of the best Austrian players in the league against a team made up of the league's top international players. Like the NBA All-Star Game, the ÖBL All-Star festivities included a slam dunk contest and a three-point shooting competition.

References

External links
 Österreichische Basketball Bundesliga Official Website
 Eurobasket.com League Page

 
Ost
Austria
Sports leagues established in 1947
1947 establishments in Austria
Basketball